The Washington Nationals are a Major League Baseball franchise based in Washington, D.C. They play in the National League East division. Formed as an expansion team in 1969 as the Montreal Expos, they were based in Montreal, Quebec, through the 2004 season. In 2005 they moved to Washington, D.C. and become known as the Washington Nationals. Seven no-hitters have been pitched in franchise history, four while the team was based in Montreal as the Expos, and three as the present-day Washington Nationals.

A no-hitter is officially recognized by Major League Baseball only "when a pitcher (or pitchers) allows no hits during the entire course of a game, which consists of at least nine innings". No-hitters of less than nine complete innings were previously recognized by the league as official; however, several rule alterations in 1991 changed the rule to its current form.

Dennis Martínez threw the first and thus far only perfect game, a special subcategory of no-hitter, in Expos/Nationals franchise history on July 28, 1991, during the Expos era. As defined by Major League Baseball, "in a perfect game, no batter reaches any base during the course of the game."

The umpire is also an integral part of any no-hitter. The task of the umpire in a baseball game is to make any decision "which involves judgment, such as, but not limited to, whether a batted ball is fair or foul, whether a pitch is a strike or a ball, or whether a runner is safe or out… [the umpire's judgment on such matters] is final." Part of the duties of the umpire making calls at home plate includes defining the strike zone, which "is defined as that area over homeplate (sic) the upper limit of which is a horizontal line at the midpoint between the top of the shoulders and the top of the uniform pants, and the lower level is a line at the hollow beneath the kneecap." These calls define every baseball game and are therefore integral to the completion of any no-hitter.

The manager is another integral part of any no-hitter. The tasks of the manager include determining the starting rotation as well as batting order and defensive lineup every game.

List of no-hitters in Expos/Nationals history

See also
List of Major League Baseball no-hitters

References

No-hit
Washington Nationals